This is a list of launches made by the R-7 Semyorka ICBM, and its derivatives between 1970 and 1974. All launches are orbital satellite launches, unless stated otherwise.



References